is a railway station on the Nanao Line in the city of Kahoku, Ishikawa Prefecture, Japan, operated by the West Japan Railway Company (JR West).

Lines

Station layout
The station consists of two opposed unnumbered side platforms connected by a footbridge. The station is unattended.

Platforms

Adjacent stations

History
The station opened on June 15, 1901. With the privatization of Japanese National Railways (JNR) on April 1, 1987, the station came under the control of JR West. The station building was rebuilt in 2010.

Surrounding area

 Kanatsu Elementary School

See also
 List of railway stations in Japan

External links

  

Railway stations in Ishikawa Prefecture
Stations of West Japan Railway Company
Railway stations in Japan opened in 1901
Nanao Line
Kahoku, Ishikawa